Linha Direta (lit. Direct Line) was a Brazilian television program broadcast by Globo Network. Similar in style and loosely based on the United States program, America's Most Wanted, this program has also helped the Brazilian authorities apprehend many criminals at large trying to escape justice. The program was cancelled in 2007.

There were two special editions of the program: Linha Direta Justiça that presented famous Brazilian crimes, like the Candelária massacre, the death of Josef Mengele and the Jules Rimet theft on Rio de Janeiro; and the Linha Direta Mistério, about stories of the supernatural, like the Operação Prato, the legend of the thirteen souls that died on the Joelma fire and cases of NDE.

All shows featured reenactments using actors as well as interviews with journalists and principal characters.

See also 
 Globo Network

External links
 

Rede Globo original programming
Brazilian television series
1999 Brazilian television series debuts
2007 Brazilian television series endings
1990s Brazilian television series
2000s Brazilian television series
Brazilian crime television series
Portuguese-language television shows
America's Most Wanted